The European Medical Association (EMA) was established by doctors from the 12 member states in 1990 in Belgium, EMA is the main association representing Medical Doctors in Europe, supporting the European Commission - Lifelong Learning Programme (LLP).

References

External links
EMA home page
EMA project supported 75% by LLP
Lifelong Learning Programme (LLP)

Organizations established in 1990
Medical and health organisations based in Belgium
Organisations associated with the European Commission